POU or pou may refer to:

People
 Pou (surname), a surname
 Chu Pou (303–350), Chinese general and politician
 Pou Temara (born 1948), New Zealand Māori academic

Codes
 POU, IATA airport code and FAA location identifier for Hudson Valley Regional Airport, New York, United States
 POU, Amtrak station code for Poughkeepsie station, a rail station in Poughkeepsie, New York, United States
 pou, deprecated ISO 639-3 code for the Southern Poqomam language, spoken in Guatemala

Other uses
 Pou (video game), a 2012 video game
 Pou (deity), a Moriori deity.
 POU domain, the conserved region in the POU family of proteins
 Point of use (POU) water treatment equipment, also called portable water purification